James Way Covert (September 2, 1842 – May 16, 1910) was an American lawyer and politician who served five terms as a United States representative from New York from 1877 to 1881, and from 1889 to 1895

Biography
Born at Oyster Bay, he attended the public schools and received an academic education in Locust Valley. He studied law, was admitted to the bar in 1863, and commenced practice in Flushing. He was district school commissioner from 1867 to 1870, assistant prosecuting attorney of Queens County, and Surrogate of Queens County from 1870 to 1874.

Tenures in Congress 
Covert was elected as a Democrat to the 45th and 46th United States Congresses, holding office from March 4, 1877, to March 3, 1881. He was Chairman of the House Committee on Agriculture (46th Congress). He was a member of the New York State Senate (1st D.) in 1882 and 1883.

He was elected to the 51st, 52nd and 53rd United States Congresses, holding office from March 4, 1889, to March 3, 1895. He was Chairman of the House Committee on Patents (53rd Congress).

Later career and death 
Covert moved to Brooklyn in 1896 and resumed the practice of law. He died in Brooklyn in 1910; interment was in Mount Olivet Cemetery in Maspeth.

References

1842 births
1910 deaths
People from Oyster Bay (town), New York
Democratic Party New York (state) state senators
New York (state) state court judges
Democratic Party members of the United States House of Representatives from New York (state)
People from Locust Valley, New York
19th-century American politicians
19th-century American judges
Burials at Mount Olivet Cemetery (Queens)
Lawyers from Brooklyn